Video Arts is a UK-based video production company which produces and sells soft-skills training programmes, e-learning courses and learning platforms. Video Arts also distributes third party titles. It was founded in 1972 by John Cleese, Sir Antony Jay and a group of other television professionals.
 
Cleese sold the company in the 1990s, and it was later bought by Tinopolis in 2007. Cleese continued to feature in Video Arts' training videos.

Video Arts uses humour in its videos in order to make learning points more memorable. Its slogan is a quote from John Cleese: “People learn nothing when they’re asleep, and very little when they’re bored".

Video Arts' productions include;
 Meetings, Bloody Meetings (John Cleese, Will Smith)
 Can You Spare a Moment (John Cleese, Ricky Gervais)
 The Balance Sheet Barrier (John Cleese, Ronnie Corbett, later version with Dawn French)
 Jamie's School Dinners: Managing Change (Jamie Oliver)
 Pass It On (Rob Brydon, Will Smith)
 The Ultimate Stress Show (Olivia Colman)
 Performance Review: Every Appraisee's Dream (Hugh Laurie)
 The Art of Selling (Sheridan Smith)
 Behavioural Interviewing (James Nesbitt, Rebecca Front, Kris Marshall)
 Assert Yourself (Kris Marshall, Mark Heap)
 Performance Review: Code Red (Sharon Horgan, Jim Howick, David Schaal),
 Successful Selling (Kevin Bishop, James Lance, Simon Greenall)
 Sell It To Me (Robert Lindsay)
 30 Ways to Make More Time (James Nesbitt)
 Presentation is Everything (Mathew Horne)

As well as corporate training videos, the company produced the comedy series, Fairly Secret Army, for Channel 4.

References

External links
 Patrick Russell:  Shooting the message #20: Video Arts. The inside scoop on communications film legend Video Arts, founded by Anthony Jay and John Cleese 40 years ago at British Film Institute website, 20 July 2015

Television production companies of the United Kingdom
Mass media companies established in 1972
1972 establishments in England